The splendid starling (Lamprotornis splendidus), also known as the splendid glossy-starling, is a species of starling in the family Sturnidae.

Range
It is found in Angola, Benin, Botswana, Burundi, Cameroon, the  Central African Republic, the Republic of the Congo, the Democratic Republic of the Congo, Equatorial Guinea, Ethiopia, Gabon, Gambia, Ghana, Guinea, Guinea-Bissau, Kenya, Liberia, Mali, Niger, Nigeria, Rwanda, São Tomé and Príncipe, Senegal, Sierra Leone, South Sudan, Tanzania, Togo, Uganda, and Zambia  and is introduced in Belgium.

Gallery

References

splendid starling
Birds of Sub-Saharan Africa
Birds of the Gulf of Guinea
splendid starling
Taxa named by Louis Jean Pierre Vieillot
Taxonomy articles created by Polbot